WGVT-LD, virtual and UHF digital channel 26, is a low-powered Retro TV-affiliated television station licensed to Gainesville, Florida. The station is owned by Budd Broadcasting.

History 
The station’s construction permit was initially a digital companion channel issued on January 23, 2004 under the calls of W26CZ. On November 27, 2006, it was reassigned the callsign WSSH-LP . On March 17, 2009, it moved to the current callsign WGVT-LD.

Digital channels

Other Budd Broadcasting Stations
WGVT-LD - Gainesville, Florida
WNFT-LD - Gainesville, Florida
WOFT-LD - Orlando, Florida
WUJX-LD - Jacksonville, Florida

Former Budd Broadcasting Stations
WFXU - Live Oak, Florida - sold to Gray Television
WGCT-LP - Yankeetown, Florida - defunct
WGFL - High Springs, Florida - sold to Pegasus Communications
WKUG-LP - Glasgow, Kentucky - defunct
WKUT-LD - Elizabethtown, Kentucky - sold to HC2 Holdings
WKUW-LD - White House, Tennessee - sold to HC2 Holdings

References

External links

Low-power television stations in the United States
GVT-LD
Television channels and stations established in 2004
2004 establishments in Florida
Gainesville, Florida